Black Canadians have lived in New Brunswick since at least the 1690s. As of 2021, there were 12,100 Black residents in New Brunswick - making them the largest visible minority group in the province.

History

About 3,300 black loyalists arrived in the province in the mid-1780s, following the American Revolutionary War. They had been promised land grants in exchange for their service in the British army. Given either poor land or no land at all, most left for Sierra Leone.

An additional wave of 371 African-American refugees arrived in 1815, following the War of 1812.

The first human rights protest in New Brunswick occurred in 1916, when most of Saint John's Black community took part in protests over the showing of the controversial American movie The Birth of a Nation. The spiritual heart of Saint John's Black community was the St. Philips African Methodist Episcopalian Church, which was demolished in 1942.

In 1935, Eldridge "Gus" Eatman, a black man from Saint John tried to raise an Ethiopian Foreign Legion to fight for Ethiopia, which was threatened with an invasion by Italy. Eatman's call to defend Ethiopia drew an enthusiastic response to defend what the black lawyer Joseph Spencer-Pitt called  "the last sovereign state belonging to the coloured race". However, it appears that no volunteers actually reached Ethiopia.

Since the immigration reforms of the 1970s, the province's multi-generational Black community has been joined by immigrants from the Caribbean and Africa. Some of the larger groups include Jamaicans, people from Democratic Republic of the Congo, Haitians, and Nigerians. Meanwhile, many from New Brunswick's long established Black communities have moved out of the province. Bangor, Maine's lumber industry in particular attracted Black people from New Brunswick for decades. They formed a sizeable community on the town's west end throughout the 1900s.

The term Africadia was coined by George Elliott Clarke in the 1990s to refer to the combined group identity of African Canadian communities from Nova Scotia and New Brunswick.

21st century
In May 2021, Kassim Doumbia was elected mayor of Shippagan, New Brunswick, making him the first Black mayor in the province's history.

In June 2021, the first permanent display dedicated to the preservation of New Brunswick's Black history opened in Saint John. The opening of the New Brunswick Black Heritage Centre follows the opening of similar institutions such as the Black Cultural Centre for Nova Scotia and the Amherstburg Freedom Museum in Ontario.

Settlements
As in many Canadian provinces, independent rural all-Black settlements existed in New Brunswick since the 1800s. Two prominent settlements in New Brunswick were Willow Grove and Elm Hill. As of 2022, only the settlement of Elm Hill remains. The residents of Willow Grove are noted to be settled on extremely infertile land, where very little agriculture was possible. Commerce and industry was also difficult in Willow Grove due to the remoteness of the area from major cities at a time where most lacked access to vehicles or public transit. It was largely depopulated by the 1970s, when most young people chose to relocate to Saint John in search of a better range of opportunities. Woodstock and Kingsclear both had significant Black communities until the 1970s. 

Today, over 60% of New Brunswick's Black population lives in one of three cities: Moncton, Saint John, or Fredericton. Along with the Indigenous Black Canadian population, the three cities have attracted a growing immigrant African population.

Notable people
 Measha Brueggergosman, opera singer
 Lawrence Costello, police officer killed in the 2018 Fredericton shooting
 Anna Minerva Henderson, teacher, civil servant and poet
 Manny McIntyre, professional baseball and ice hockey player
 Willie O'Ree, first Black player in the National Hockey League (NHL)

See also
Black Nova Scotians

Notes

References 

 
 
 
Canadians
Ethnic groups in Canada
Canadian people of African descent
African-American diaspora
Peoples of the African-American diaspora